Plainfield Academy may refer to:

Plainfield Academy for the Arts and Advanced Studies in Plainfield, New Jersey
Plainfield Academy in Plainfield Community Consolidated School District 202 in Illinois
Plainfield Academy, an elite boarding school that was located in Plainfield, Connecticut